Chehel Dar castle is a historical castle located in Savadkuh County in Mazandaran Province, The longevity of this fortress dates back to the 6th and 7th centuries AH.

References 

Castles in Iran